Shimmer Chinodya (born 1957 Gwelo, then Federation of Rhodesia and Nyasaland) is a Zimbabwean novelist.

He studied at Mambo Primary School. He was expelled from Goromonzi after demonstrating against Ian Smith's government. He graduated from the University of Zimbabwe, and from the University of Iowa, with an MA in creative writing, in 1985.

Awards
 1990 Commonwealth Writers' Prize, Africa region.
 2007 National Arts Merit Awards Outstanding Fiction Book for Strife

Works
; Heinemann, 2001, 
Farai’s Girls (1984)
Child of War (1986)
Harvest of Thorns  (1989)
Can we talk and other Stories (1998)
Tale of Tamari (2004)
Chairman of Fools (2005)

 Tindo's Quest, Longman Zimbabwe (Pvt) (January 2011),

References

1957 births
Living people
People from Gweru
Zimbabwean novelists
University of Zimbabwe alumni
University of Iowa alumni
Zimbabwean male short story writers
Zimbabwean short story writers
Male novelists
20th-century novelists
21st-century novelists
20th-century short story writers
21st-century short story writers
20th-century male writers
21st-century male writers